Kucherla (Kuĵurlu) is a rural locality (a settlement) in Katandinskoye Rural Settlement of Ust-Koksinsky District, the Altai Republic, Russia. The population was 185 as of 2016. There are 7 streets.

Geography 
Kucherla is located on the left bank of the Kucherla River, 62 km southeast of Ust-Koksa (the district's administrative centre) by road. Tyungur is the nearest rural locality.

References 

Rural localities in Ust-Koksinsky District